Erik Sándor Fülöp (born in Nyíregyháza, Hungary on July 21, 1982) is a Hungarian lawyer and politician. He was a member of parliament in National Assembly of Hungary (Országgyűlés). He was elected into office in 2018. Between 2010 and 2018 he served as mayor of Tiszavasvár.

Early life 
Fülöp was born on July 21, 1982 in Nyíregyháza. Between 1994 to 2000, he attended the Váci Mihály High School in Tiszavasvár, where he graduated. From 2000 to 2005 he attended University of Miskolc and studied law. He graduated University of Miskolc with a degree in law.

Career 
Fülöp joined Jobbik in 2010. Between 2010 and 2018, he was the mayor of Tiszavasvári, and from 2014 he was as representative of the Szabolcs-Szatmár-Bereg County Assembly.

In 2018, he gained a parliamentary seat on Jobbik’s national list and resigned as Mayor of Tiszavasvári. On October 8, 2018 he left Jobbik and became a member of the Our Homeland Movement. On January 25, 2021, Erik Fülöp announced his resignation from the Our Homeland Movement on his Facebook page. He continued to work as an independent, focusing on his own field of expertise, animal welfare, rather than party politics. He was a member of the committee on Legislation and committee on Justice in the National Assembly of Hungary.

In September 2021, he announced that he would not run in the 2022 parliamentary election.

References 

1982 births
Living people
People from Nyíregyháza
Jobbik politicians
Our Homeland Movement politicians
21st-century Hungarian politicians
Members of the National Assembly of Hungary (2018–2022)
Mayors of places in Hungary